The men's shot put at the 1962 British Empire and Commonwealth Games as part of the athletics programme was held at the Perry Lakes Stadium on Thursday 29 November 1962.

Lucking's throw set a new Games record, eclipsing the mark that fellow Englishman Arthur Rowe had set in Cardiff four years earlier.

Records

The following records were established during the competition:

Final

References

Men's shot put
1962